Katy (2015) is a children's book by author Jacqueline Wilson. It is a modern-day retelling of What Katy Did. The author loved the book What Katy Did, so when she got older and became a mother, she used to read the book to her daughter, but she noticed the moral was not appropriate for today's generation. So she rewrote the whole book, in a modern way.
Katy has five younger siblings. She is brilliant with them but she's also a daredevil. She's a fan of skateboarding and adventures. She loves the feeling of soaring upwards and has happy memories of her deceased mum pushing her on a swing. But after a tragic accident her spirit sinks to the lowest point. Katy wonders if she'll ever be able to feel like flying again.

Plot 

Katy and her siblings often sneak next door to their neighbour's back garden, calling it a secret garden. They play all sorts of games.
She has a best friend Cecy, who comes to the secret garden too. Katy's family consists of her dad, who is a doctor, Izzie, her stepmother, Clover, her sister who is described as sweet and kind, Elsie, her stepsister who she does not get along with, and her half siblings, twins Dorry and Jonnie, and 'little' Phil.
 
During the school holidays, her father’s old patient, Helen, comes on a visit. Helen is in a wheelchair due to rheumatic arthritis. Katy and her siblings are inspired by her deeply. At the end of Helen's visit, she produces one of her possessions, a seahorse necklace, and decides to give it to Katy. Katy vows to treasure it forever.

One day during the summer, Katy decides to sneak out to go to a skatepark, but she can't find it. In despair, she decides to go back home but breaks the chain on her seahorse necklace in the process. Her stepmother Izzie grounds her for sneaking out, and Katy is not allowed to go to the swimming pool with the rest of her family.

Katy decides that she can have fun by herself. She takes a rope to the secret garden next door and attempts to build a swing with a rope by tying it to the branch of a tree. Unfortunately, the rope is not knotted correctly, and unties itself. She falls out of the tree, breaking her spine in the process. She has vivid flashbacks of her mother. Mrs Burton, the woman who owns the garden, sees Katy fall and calls an ambulance.

Katy is rushed to the hospital, where they operate on her and discover she is now paralyzed from the waist down. During her hospital stay, she meets edgy older boy Dexter in the boys ward and the two form a friendship quickly. Katy also starts to get along with the other girls in her ward, feeling fond of them. Her siblings come to visit with presents. She also forms a better relationship with her stepmother and stepsister.

After Katy leaves the hospital, Helen comes on a visit, making Katy realise that a disability can't stop her from living the life she wants. Katy starts to attend secondary school where her friends have already started. She struggles as she is in a wheelchair, but eventually learns that her disability doesn't define her.

The book ends with Katy receiving presents from people around her at Christmas, including a new wheelchair.

Characters 

Katy Carr: The main protagonist, and 11 year old tomboyish and daredevil girl, the eldest in the family.

Clover Carr: the second-eldest sister who adores Katy and follows her in everything she does. Clover is pretty and clever with a cheerful disposition; she is described as blue eyed and blonde.

Elsie Carr: the third sister, an awkward child at the beginning of the book, too old to play with the 'babies' and too young to be included in Katy and Clover's games. She tries her hardest to join in, but is usually ignored.  After Katy is injured Elsie proves very helpful and considerate, and she and Katy finally grow close.

Dorry Carr: (short for Dorison) a chubby boy who is stereotyped to like eating. 

Johnnie Carr (short for Johanna): A tomboyish girl. Twin of Dorry. Attached to a toy zebra chair named 'Zebby'.

Phil Carr: the baby of the family.

Cecy Hall: a pretty and tidy girl, the daughter of their neighbour and a good friend of the siblings.

Eva Jenkins:  a classmate of Katy and Cecy, described as silly and self centered.

Doctor Carr: the children's father, struggling with his first wife's death. Also Helen's old doctor.

Izzie: Katy and Clover's stepmother.

Helen: Doctor Carr's old patient; she cannot walk because of rheumatic arthritis years ago. Despite her suffering she is amusing, cheerful, and kind, all the children love her. After Katy's accident, Helen helps her adjust to her illness.

Dexter: 16 year old in the boys ward at the hospital. He is paralysed like Katy after a motorcycle accident. Dexter has a love of drawing, and despite Katy being 5 years younger, they become firm friends.

Adaptation 

In June 2017, CBBC announced they have commissioned a three-part series based on the novel.

The three-part TV series "Katy" began on 14 March 2018.

References 

2015 British novels
Novels by Jacqueline Wilson
British children's novels
2015 children's books
Puffin Books books